Vancouver Coastal Health (VCH) is a regional health authority that provides health services including primary, secondary, tertiary and quaternary care, home and community care, mental health services, population and preventive health and addictions services in part of Greater Vancouver and the Coast Garibaldi area.

VCH is one of five publicly funded regional healthcare authorities within the Canadian province of British Columbia. The government of British Columbia, through the British Columbia Ministry of Health, sets province-wide goals, standards and performance agreements for health service delivery by the seven health authorities.

Service area
Vancouver Coastal Health Authority serves the 1.25million of British Columbia's population of five million (approximately one in four) who live in a geographic area of  that includes 12 municipalities, four regional districts and 14 Aboriginal communities. VCH is geographically divided into three health service delivery areas (HSDA), which in turn are divided into 14 local health areas (LHA).

The following regional districts are partially or entirely covered by VCHA.
 Metro Vancouver Regional District (partial: includes city of Vancouver, Richmond, and the North Shore only)
 Squamish-Lillooet Regional District (partial: Howe Sound LHSA includes Squamish, Whistler, and Pemberton; excludes Lillooet)
 Sunshine Coast Regional District
 qathet Regional District (including Powell River)
 Central Coast Regional District (including Bella Bella and Bella Coola)
 Cariboo Regional District (partial: Bella Coola Valley LHSA includes Electoral Area J only)

Health services provided

See also

Other regional health authorities in British Columbia 
Fraser Health
Interior Health
Island Health
Northern Health

Province-wide health authorities in British Columbia 
Provincial Health Services Authority
First Nations Health Authority

References

2001 establishments in British Columbia
Health regions of British Columbia